The University of Venda (Univen;) is a South African comprehensive rural-based institution, located in Thohoyandou in Limpopo province. It was established in 1982 under the then Republic of Venda government.

History

The university was established in 1982 to serve the inhabitants of the Venda Bantustan; however, the student body at Univen never consisted of Venda students only as students from all over the Northern Transvaal attended the institution. After the end of Apartheid and the re-integration of the bantustans into South Africa, Univen student body were drawn from all over South Africa. With the South African government's programme of tertiary education reform in the new millennium, Univen became a "comprehensive university", offering both theoretically oriented and practically oriented courses.

Campus
The University of Venda has one main Campus in Thohoyandou. The Campus houses all eight schools of the institution namely 
The School of Agriculture, 
The School of Education, 
The School of Environmental Science, 
The School of Health Sciences, 
The School of Human and Social Sciences, 
The School of Management Sciences, 
The School of Mathematical and Natural Sciences,
The School of Law.

The campus also houses the Art Gallery, which has a display of carvings, paintings and clay pots made by both students and the local community members. Furthermore, the campus has a full-time Sport Center that is used for indoor sports as well as other recreational activities such as drama and dance.

The main campus houses 11 of the twelve official residences, namely Bernard Ncube, Carousel, F3, F4, F5, Lost City Boys, Lost City Girls, Mango Groove, Riverside , New Male res, New female res and prefab.

Student Representative Assembly
The representative student body of the University of Venda is made up an 84-member parliament styled structure. It is led by a 14-member cabinet also known as the SRC executive. The assembly can be further divided into three: the first sub-division is the cabinet that is led by the president, then the deputy president, the secretary-general, the deputy secretary general, there are nine ministerial portfolios as follows; Ministry of Campus and off Campus Housing, Ministry of Education, Ministry of Finance, Bursaries and Projects, Ministry of Gender and people with Disabilities, Ministry of Health, Safety and Security, Ministry of Information, External Affairs and International Relations, Ministry of Legal, Policies, and Constitutional Affairs, Ministry of Religion, Culture, Arts and Heritage, Ministry of Sports and Recreation, and with the equivalence of a ministry there is the Chairperson of the Post Graduate Council. The second sub-division of the SRC is the Structures. These are made up of four-person executives of the Disabled Student Council (DSC), the Housing Representative Council (HRC), the Sports, Recreation and Cultural Committee (SRCC) and the School Councils from all eight schools of the University. The third sub-division is the parliament, which is composed of committees under each ministerial position.

Each member of the SRC is forwarded to parliament by a student formation they belong to except the third sub-division of the Student Representative Council who campaign independently. The Speaker of Parliament is voted in on the first sitting of Parliament by the house. The student parliament sits four times a year, once each quarter of the year.

The Univen SRC is composed of members from different formations, the recognized student formations on campus are: AZAPO Student Convention (AZASCO), Democratic Alliance Student Organization (DASO), Economic Freedom Fighters Student Command (EFFSC), Pan-Africanist Student Movement of Azania (PASMA), South African Student Congress (SASCO), the Student Christian Organization (SCO) and the newly formed ABSC (ABANTU BATHO STUDENT CONGRESS). 

Each organization contests in the general elections to deploy members to the SRC, the term of office is one year, and the period begins after annual elections that are held during late September or early October. The ruling party for 2022-2023 is the Economic Freedom Fighters Students Command (EFFSC) univen branch, of which Gudani Lyoid Tshamano is the elected president.

Ranking

References

Universities in Limpopo
Public universities in South Africa
Thohoyandou
Educational institutions established in 1982
Forestry education
Forestry in South Africa
1982 establishments in South Africa